The 1992–93 Coppa Italia, the 46th Coppa Italia was an Italian Football Federation domestic cup competition won by Torino.

First round

p=after penalty kicks.

Second round

Round of 16

Quarter-finals

First leg

Second leg

Semi-finals

First leg

Second leg

Roma won 2–1 on aggregate.

3–3 on aggregate. Torino won on the away goals rule.

Final

First leg

Second leg

5–5 on aggregate. Torino won on the away goals rule.

Top goalscorers

References
rsssf.com

Coppa Italia seasons
Coppa Italia, 1992-93
Coppa Italia